Vestiaria may refer to:

Vestiaria coccinea (Drepanis coccinea), aka ʻiʻiwi or scarlet honeycreeper, a species of Hawaiian honeycreeper
Vestiaria, Portugal